Yang Yongliang (sometimes written Yang Yong-liang; born 1980 in Jiading, Shanghai) is a Chinese contemporary artist.

As a young student, he studied traditional Chinese painting and calligraphy before attending the Shanghai Art & Design Academy, where he specialized in decoration and design beginning in 1996. In 1999 he attended the China Academy of Art, Visual Communication Department, Shanghai branch. In 2005 he started his career as an artist with the stated goal of "creating new forms of contemporary art."

He currently lives and works in Shanghai.

Selected exhibitions

Selected collections 

 British Museum (London, UK)
 National Gallery of Victoria (Melbourne, Australia)
 Nevada Museum of Art (Reno, Nevada, US)
 Jordan Schnitzer Museum of Art (Eugene, Oregon, US)
 Art Gallery of New South Wales (Sydney, Australia)
 Samuel P. Harn Museum of Art (Gainesville, Florida, US)
 Bibliothèque nationale de France (Paris, France)
 White Rabbit Gallery (Sydney, Australia)

Awards

Bibliography

References

Further reading

External links 

 website
 Shenshi shanshui san (Phantom Landscape III) ceye yi (leaf one) (2008)
 Yang Yongliang Brings Chinese Landscape Painting Into The 21st Century (2012) 
 Yang Yongliang's selected works

Chinese contemporary artists
Artists from Shanghai
1980 births
Living people